Hugh White is the name of:

Hugh White, British soldier involved in the Boston Massacre
Hugh L. White (1881–1965), Governor of Mississippi
Hugh Lawson White (1773–1840), U.S. Senator from Tennessee
Hugh White (New York politician) (1798–1870), U.S. Representative from New York
Hugh White (judge) (1733–1812), grandfather of Hugh White and founder and namesake of Whitestown, New York
Hugh Edward White (1869–1939), architect in North Carolina
Hugh White (American football) (1876–1936), American football player and CEO of George A Fuller Company
Hugh White State Park, Mississippi, named after Hugh L. White
Hugh White (RAF officer) (1898–1983), World War I flying ace
Hugh White (strategist) (born 1953), Australian defence strategist